William Mariner  may refer to:
William Mariner (VC) (1882–1916), English recipient of the Victoria Cross during the First World War
William Mariner (writer) (1791–1853), Englishman who wrote of his experiences in the Polynesian island kingdom of Tonga